Susie Cave ( Bick; born 16 September 1966) is an English fashion designer, entrepreneur, and former model and occasional actress. She co-founded the fashion label The Vampire's Wife.

Early life
Susie Bick was born in Cheshire, England, to a diplomat father. She spent her childhood in Malawi and Nigeria, and ran away from boarding school at age 14.

Modelling career
Bick was discovered by photographer Steven Meisel on a flight to New York at age 14.

She modelled for Yohji Yamamoto, Christian Dior, Nina Ricci, Tuscany perfume, Versace and Yves Saint Laurent. She appeared on the covers of French Glamour, Harper's & Queen, Elle UK, and i-D. She modelled for Vivienne Westwood for ten years.

She was the cover model on the Damned's 1985 album Phantasmagoria, photographed by Bob Carlos Clarke.

Bick gave up her modelling career when she met Nick Cave in 1997.

The Vampire's Wife
In 2014, Cave co-founded the fashion label The Vampire's Wife with Alex Adamson.

Their 'Falconetti' dress was deemed the "dress of the decade" by Vogue. The Vampire's Wife has been described as a "cult favourite" label. Celebrities who have worn the brand include Catherine, Princess of Wales, Princess Beatrice, Princess Sofia, Duchess of Varmland, Kate Moss, Keira Knightley, Florence Welch, Maya Rudolph, Sienna Miller, Ruth Negga, Kirsten Dunst, Alexa Chung, Daisy Lowe, Jenna Coleman, Thandiwe Newton, Zawe Ashton, Rachel Weisz, Margot Robbie, Jennifer Aniston, and Jodie Comer.

Personal life
Bick met Australian musician Nick Cave in 1997; they married in 1999. Their twin sons, Arthur and Earl, were born in London in 2000 and raised in Brighton. She appeared on the cover of Cave's 2013 album Push the Sky Away.

On 14 July 2015, when he was 15 years old, Arthur Cave fell from a cliff at Ovingdean, near Brighton, and died from his injuries at Royal Sussex County Hospital later that day. An inquest found that Arthur had taken LSD before the fall and the coroner ruled his death was an accident. The effect of Arthur's death on the Cave family was explored in the 2016 documentary film One More Time with Feeling.

Filmography

References

External links
 
 
 Susie Bick Cave at models.com

1966 births
English businesspeople
English female models
English fashion designers
English women in business
Living people
People from Cheshire
British women fashion designers